Westwood Studios, Inc. was an American video game developer, based in Las Vegas, Nevada. It was founded by Brett Sperry and Louis Castle in 1985 as Brelous Software, but got changed after 2 months into Westwood Associates and was renamed to Westwood Studios when Virgin Games (later Virgin Interactive Entertainment) bought the company in 1992. The company was bought by Electronic Arts alongside Virgin Interactive's North American operations in 1998. In January 2003, it was announced that Westwood, alongside Westwood Pacific (EA Pacific), would be merged into EA Los Angeles. The main studio location closed in March of that year.

Westwood is best known for developing video games in the real-time strategy, adventure and role-playing genres. It was listed in Guinness World Records for selling more than 10 million copies of Command & Conquer worldwide.

History

Early history and company name

Brett Sperry and Louis Castle met in late 1983 in Las Vegas. Sperry had a background in architecture and psychology and was already working in the gaming industry. Both Sperry and Castle worked as contract programmers. The two eventually became friends and decided to form a company together and named it Brelous Software.

Sperry and Castle founded Westwood Studios in 1985.

According to Louis Castle, the company was named after the "entertainment meets professional" character of the Westwood neighborhood in Los Angeles.

The company's first projects consisted of contract work for companies like Epyx and Strategic Simulations, Inc. (SSI), porting 8-bit titles to 16-bit systems like Commodore Amiga and Atari ST. Proceeds from contract work allowed the company to expand into designing its own games in-house. Their first original title was Mars Saga, a game developed for Electronic Arts and released in 1988. They laid the foundations for the real-time strategy genre with the release of real-time tactics game BattleTech: The Crescent Hawk's Revenge, one of the more literal translations of the tabletop game BattleTech.

Later success and acquisition by Virgin Games
One of the company's first great successes was Eye of the Beholder (1991), a real-time role-playing video game based on the Dungeons & Dragons license, developed for SSI. Other publishers of early Westwood games included Infocom and Disney. Their company was eventually acquired by Virgin Games in 1992.

The company in the late 1980s was known for shipping products late, but by 1993 it had so improved that, Computer Gaming World reported, "many publishers would assure [us] that a project was going to be completed on time because Westwood was doing it". The magazine added that it "not only has a solid reputation for getting product out on time, but a reputation for good product", citing Eye of the Beholder, The Legend of Kyrandia, and Dune II as examples. By then Westwood had about 50 employees, including up to 20 artists. Other Westwood titles from the early 1990s include Lands of Lore and Westwood's greatest commercial success, the 1995 real-time strategy game Command & Conquer. Building on the gameplay and interface ideas of Dune II, it added pre-rendered 3D graphics for gameplay sprites and video cinematics, an alternative pop/rock soundtrack with techno elements streamed from disk, and online play. Command & Conquer, Kyrandia, and Lands of Lore spawned several sequels.

Acquisition by EA and liquidation
In August 1998, Westwood and sister company Burst Studios was acquired by Electronic Arts for $122.5 million from Virgin Interactive's North American operations, which EA also acquired. At the time, Westwood games had a 5% to 6% share of the PC game market, especially the Command & Conquer franchise was considered very valuable. The 50,000 square foot building in Las Vegas included motion capture facilities, comfortable offices and was considered a showcase for the industry. According to Westwood Studios designer and programmer Joe Bostic, Electronic Arts did not interfere with Westwood's operations primarily due to Westwood co-founder Brett Sperry's efforts in keeping the corporate cultures of the two companies separate, but eventually Westwood succumbed to wishes that every game had to be a hit.

The last games Command & Conquer: Renegade and Earth & Beyond did not meet expectations of the publisher. In January 2003, EA announced their intent to close Westwood, as well as EA Pacific, and merge them into EA Los Angeles as part of a consolidation plan. This move included "significant layoffs" for Westwood, which at the time employed 100 people, while the remaining people were given the option to transfer to the Los Angeles studio or EA's headquarters. Most employees were let go by January 31, while some staff stayed with Westwood transitionally until it was fully closed on March 31, 2003. Some formed Petroglyph Games in April 2003, while another three (Brett Sperry, Adam Isgreen and Rade Stojsavljevic) formed a development studio called Jet Set Games in 2008, both based in Las Vegas, Nevada.

Games

References

External links

 
Defunct video game companies of the United States
Video game development companies
Companies based in Las Vegas
Defunct companies based in Nevada
American companies established in 1985
Video game companies established in 1985
Video game companies disestablished in 2003
1985 establishments in Nevada
2003 disestablishments in Nevada
Electronic Arts
1998 mergers and acquisitions